Edval Therezino Costa (born 17 February 1954), known as Edval, is a Brazilian former footballer who played as a forward. He competed in the men's tournament at the 1976 Summer Olympics.

References

External links
 

1954 births
Living people
Footballers from Rio de Janeiro (city)
Brazilian footballers
Association football forwards
Brazil international footballers
Olympic footballers of Brazil
Footballers at the 1976 Summer Olympics